Pontaubault is a commune in the Manche department in north-western France.

History 
Patton's VIII Corps crossed the Pontaubault bridge on 1 August 1944 into Brittany following the success of Operation Cobra

Traffic 

From  29 July 1901 to 31 December 1933, Pontaubault  was connected via the  metre gauge  Avranches–Saint-James tramway to Avranches and Saint-James, which operated three steam trains for mixed passenger and goods transport each day in both directions.

See also
Communes of the Manche department

References

Communes of Manche